Kouachra (also spelled as Kaweishra or Kavashra) is a village in Akkar Governorate, Lebanon.

Location
Kouachra is located in Akkar District, near Al Qoubaiyat about an hour's drive from Tripoli. The village has a small artificial lake.

Population
Kouachra has a population of about 2,800 people, mostly of Sunni Turkish origin. And most of its residents are farmers.

The villagers support the Future Movement political party.

Turkish identity
Owing to its Turkish ethnic identity, the village was visited by the Prime Minister of Turkey, Recep Tayyip Erdogan, in 2010 and has received Turkish developmental assistance and funding, including university scholarships in Turkey.

According to one local resident: "After Ottoman rule ended in Lebanon, we decided to stay on our land. We still maintain our Turkish language and traditions."

The village also houses several hundred Syrian Turkmen who have fled the Syrian Civil War.

See also
Turks in Lebanon

References

Populated places in Akkar District
Sunni Muslim communities in Lebanon